Schwelm is a town in the district of Ennepe-Ruhr-Kreis in the administrative region of Arnsberg within the state of North Rhine-Westphalia.

Geography
Schwelm is situated in the southeast of the "Ruhrgebiet", the Ruhr district of Germany, between Westphalia and the "Bergisches Land". Schwelm is commonly known as the "Pforte Westfalens" ("Gate to Westphalia").

Neighbouring places
Surrounding towns include Ennepetal, Gevelsberg, Sprockhövel and Wuppertal.

Division of the town
Schwelm is called the "town of neighbourhoods". It is made up of the following 13 neighbourhoods:

 Aechte de Muer
 Brunnen
 Fronhof
 Linderhausen
 Loh
 Möllenkotten
 Oberstadt
 Oehde
 Ossenkamp
 Parliament
 Rote Wasser
 Winterberg
 Zur alten Post

History
The history of Schwelm can be traced back to the ninth century, where it is first mentioned as "Suelmiu". The town of Schwelm was officially established in 1496 and became seat of the Ennepe-Ruhr district in 1929. According to its area, Schwelm is the smallest town in North Rhine-Westphalia.

Language/dialect
A Westphalian variety of high German is spoken in Schwelm (Westphalian: from old Saxon Westfal = "western land"). The Westphalian dialect belongs to the low Saxon dialects, which is a part of the family of low German dialects. Compared to other German regions (e.g., Bavaria or Swabia) the dialect does not have a strong influence on the everyday speech. Especially the elderly population is still able to speak Schwelm's original Westphalian tongue, called Schwelmer Platt, which is quite different from standard high German and bears a certain resemblance to Dutch.

Politics
The current mayor of Schwelm is Stephan Langhard of the Social Democratic Party (SPD) since 2020. In the most recent mayoral election on 13 and 27 September 2020, Langhard advanced to the runoff with 41.85% of votes against Philipp Beckmann of the Free Democratic Party (FDP), who won 30.4%. Heinz-Jürgen Lenz, with the endorsement of the CDU and The Greens, placed third with 27.8%. In the runoff, Langhard won with 52.4% of votes.

Local council 

The Schwelm city council governs the city alongside the Mayor. The most recent city council election was held on 13 September 2020, and the results were as follows:

! colspan=2| Party
! Votes
! %
! +/-
! Seats
! +/-
|-
| bgcolor=| 
| align=left| Social Democratic Party (SPD)
| 3,302
| 29.5
|  1.8
| 14
|  2
|-
| bgcolor=| 
| align=left| Christian Democratic Union (CDU)
| 2,998
| 26.8
|  2.7
| 13
|  2
|-
| bgcolor=| 
| align=left| Alliance 90/The Greens (Grüne)
| 1,794
| 16.1
|  7.1
| 8
|  5
|-
| bgcolor=| 
| align=left| Free Democratic Party (FDP)
| 1,532
| 13.7
|  6.9
| 7
|  3
|-
| 
| align=left| Schwelmer Voters' Association/Citizens for Schwelm (SWG/BfS)
| 484
| 4.3
|  3.7
| 2
|  1
|-
| bgcolor=| 
| align=left| The Left (Die Linke)
| 484
| 4.3
|  1.4
| 2
| ±0
|-
| 
| align=left| Education, Innovation, Future (BIZ)
| 441
| 3.9
| New
| 2
| New
|-
| colspan=7 bgcolor=lightgrey| 
|-
| 
| align=left| All for Schwelm (AFS)
| 145
| 1.3
| New
| 0
| New
|-
! colspan=2| Valid votes
! 11,180
! 98.5
! 
! 
! 
|-
! colspan=2| Invalid votes
! 172
! 1.5
! 
! 
! 
|-
! colspan=2| Total
! 11,352
! 100.0
! 
! 48
!  10
|-
! colspan=2| Electorate/voter turnout
! 22,534
! 50.4
! 
! 
! 
|-
| colspan=7| Source: City of Schwelm
|}

Points of interest
Schwelm has got a historical town center with many old houses, some of which date back to the 18th century. The Altmarkt is a historical market place lying in front of the tall Christuskirche, the town's principal Protestant church. From the Altmarkt, the decorative street Kölner Strasse leads uphill and is part of the former road to Cologne.

Until 2011, Schwelm was home to the Brauerei Schwelm, the "Schwelm Brewery", one of few remaining private breweries in North Rhine-Westphalia. Established in 1830 by Haarmann & Kathagen, the brewery was one of the first worldwide to switch from wooden to metal storage containers. The original administration building, the Rietz'sche Haus built in 1701, is an appealing house in the town center. Most of the brewery's historic production site, however, was torn down in 2012.

The oldest piano manufacturer in the world is located in Schwelm. Since 1794, Rud. Ibach Sohn has been building pianos and, until 1904, organs in Schwelm.

Europe's biggest fair-trade organisation "GEPA" was founded in Schwelm in the 1970s, but is now located in Wuppertal.

A historical Jewish cemetery, dating from the late 18th century is located in the countryside about 1.3 km south of the town's center. It is maintained by the municipality and volunteers.

Twin towns – sister cities

Schwelm is twinned with:
 Saint-Germain-en-Laye, France (formerly Fourqueux)

Notable people

Friedrich Christoph Müller (1751–1808), theologian and cartographer, lived here in 1785–1808
Friedrich Springorum (1858–1938), engineer and entrepreneur
Wilhelm Göcke (1898–1944), Nazi SS concentration camp commandant
Gustav Heinemann (1899–1976), third president of the Federal Republic of Germany from 1969 to 1974
Johannes Joachim Degenhardt (1926–2002), Cardinal and archbishop of Paderborn
Franz Josef Degenhardt (1931–2011), political singer-songwriter
Martin Grötschel (born 1948), mathematician
Rolf Rüssmann (1950–2009), football player and manager
Torsten Schmidt (born 1972), racing cyclist
Olivia Spiker (born 1981), Polish-German amateur boxer

Gallery

See also
Cities in North Rhine-Westphalia

References

External links

 
History of Schwelm 

Ennepe-Ruhr-Kreis